Capilla jayadeva, the striped dawnfly, is a species of hesperid butterfly found in tropical Asia.

Range
The butterfly is found in India from Sikkim and north-east Bengal to Assam and is also found in Laos.

In 1891, Edward Yerbury Watson wrote:

The type locality is Darjeeling.

Status
Rare.

Description

Watson also gave this detailed description:

He also stated:

Cited references

References
Print

Watson, E. Y. (1891) Hesperiidae indicae: being a reprint of descriptions of the Hesperiidae of India, Burma, and Ceylon.. Vest and Co. Madras.

Online

Brower, Andrew V. Z. (2007). Capila Moore 1866. Version 4 March 2007 (under construction). http://tolweb.org/Capila/95329/2007.03.04 in The Tree of Life Web Project, http://tolweb.org/

Capila
Butterflies of Asia
Butterflies of Indochina